Jan Philip Solovej (born 14 June 1961) is a Danish mathematician and mathematical physicist working on the mathematical theory of quantum mechanics. He is a professor at University of Copenhagen.

Biography 

Solovej obtained his Ph.D. in 1989 from Princeton University with the thesis on "Universality in the Thomas-Fermi-von Weizsäcker Model of Atoms and Molecules" supervised by Elliott H. Lieb. As a post-doctoral researcher, he went to the University of Michigan in 1989/90 and to the University of Toronto in 1990. In 1991 (and 2003/04) he was a member at the Institute for Advanced Study. From 1991 to 1995, he was Assistant Professor in the Department of Mathematics at Princeton University. From 1995 to 1997, he was a research professor at the University of Aarhus. Since 1997, he has been a professor in the Department of Mathematics at the University of Copenhagen. Since 2016, he has been the Centre leader of VILLUM Centre of Excellence for the Mathematics of Quantum Theory (QMATH).

He is Editor in Chief of Journal of Mathematical Physics (since 2019).

He is married and has two children.

Recognition 
Solovej is a member of the Royal Danish Academy of Sciences and Letters (elected 2000) and of the Academia Europaea(elected 2020). He was named a Fellow of the American Mathematical Society, in the 2022 class of fellows, "for contributions to the rigorous analysis of quantum systems, particularly many-body systems".

In 2021, he received the Henri Poincaré Prize from the International Association of Mathematical Physics. In 2022, he will give an invited talk at the International Congress of Mathematicians (ICM) in  St Petersburg. He was an invited speaker at the 2nd European Congress of Mathematics (1996) in Budapest (Mathematical results on the structure of large atoms) and again at the 4th European Congress of Mathematics (2004) in Stockholm (Mathematical problems of large quantum systems). He was a plenary speaker at the International Congress on Mathematical Physics in 1991, 2003 and 2021.

Works 

Solovej deals with mathematical questions in atomic physics (large atoms and molecules in the Thomas-Fermi model and the Hartree-Fock method), solid-state physics (the Bose-Einstein condensate, Bogoliubov transformation, quantum dot, Heisenberg model and others) and in many-body quantum mechanics (the stability of matter, the Lieb-Thirring inequality and others). He is co-author, together with Elliott H. Lieb, Robert Seiringer, and Jakob Yngvason, of a monograph on the mathematics of the Bose gas.

In 1995, with Elliott H. Lieb and Michael Loss, he proved the stability of matter in magnetic fields.

In 2003, he established the ionization conjecture for atoms within the Hartree-Fock theory, namely the excess charge, the ionization energy and the  radius of an atom are uniformly bounded independently of the nuclear charge. Related questions for many-body Schrödinger equation remain open, which are Problems 9, 10, 11 of the Simon problems on Schrödinger operators.

In 2012, with Rupert L. Frank, Christian Hainzl and Robert Seiringer, he derived the Ginzburg-Landau theory from the BCS theory.

In 2014, with Elliott H. Lieb, he proved Wehrl's conjecture on the mininimum entropy of quantum spin systems.

In 2020, with Søren Fournais, he proved the Lee-Huang-Yang conjecture on the ground state energy of dilute Bose gases.

Selection of publications

References

External links

1961 births
Academic staff of the University of Copenhagen
Living people
Princeton University alumni
Fellows of the American Mathematical Society
Presidents of the European Mathematical Society